Oriental Mindoro's at-large congressional district is a former congressional district that encompassed the area of Oriental Mindoro in the Philippines. It was represented in the House of Representatives from 1952 to 1972 and in the Regular Batasang Pambansa from 1984 to 1986. The province of Oriental Mindoro was created as a result of the partition of Mindoro in 1950 and elected its first representative provincewide at-large during the 1953 Philippine House of Representatives elections. Raúl T. Leuterio who served as representative of Mindoro's at-large congressional district during the partition was this district's first representative upon the election of a representative for Occidental Mindoro on January 25, 1952. The district remained a single-member district until the dissolution of the lower house in 1972. It was later absorbed by the multi-member Region IV-A's at-large district for the national parliament in 1978. In 1984, provincial and city representations were restored and Oriental Mindoro elected two members for the regular parliament. The district was abolished following the 1987 reapportionment under a new constitution.

Representation history

See also
Legislative districts of Oriental Mindoro

References

Former congressional districts of the Philippines
Politics of Oriental Mindoro
1950 establishments in the Philippines
1972 disestablishments in the Philippines
1984 establishments in the Philippines
1986 disestablishments in the Philippines
At-large congressional districts of the Philippines
Congressional districts of Mimaropa
Constituencies established in 1950
Constituencies disestablished in 1972
Constituencies established in 1984
Constituencies disestablished in 1986